Homoeocera trizona is a moth of the subfamily Arctiinae first described by Paul Dognin in 1906. It is found in Colombia and Venezuela.

References

Euchromiina
Moths described in 1906